Debbie G. Buckner (born March 4, 1955) is an American politician who has served in the Georgia House of Representatives since 2003.

References

|-

|-

1955 births
Living people
Democratic Party members of the Georgia House of Representatives
21st-century American politicians
21st-century American women politicians
Women state legislators in Georgia (U.S. state)